The communauté de communes Sauldre et Sologne  was created on December 29, 2005 and is located in the Cher  département  of the Centre-Val de Loire region of France. In January 2021 Nançay left the communauté de communes Vierzon-Sologne-Berry and joined Sauldre et Sologne. Its area is 970.8 km2, and its population was 14,597 in 2018.

Composition
The communauté de communes consists of the following 14 communes:

Argent-sur-Sauldre
Aubigny-sur-Nère
Blancafort
Brinon-sur-Sauldre
La Chapelle-d'Angillon
Clémont
Ennordres
Ivoy-le-Pré
Ménétréol-sur-Sauldre
Méry-ès-Bois
Nançay
Oizon
Presly
Sainte-Montaine

References

Sauldre et Sologne
Sauldre et Sologne